Morris Steggerda (September 1, 1900 − March 15, 1950) was an American physical anthropologist. He worked primarily on Central American and Caribbean populations.

Life and career 
Steggerda was born in Holland, Michigan, the son of Sena (Ter Vree) and John Steggerda. He was of Dutch descent. He received an A.B. from Hope College in 1922, and an A.M. and Ph.D from the Department of Zoology of the University of Illinois, in 1923 and 1928 respectively. His first academic position was as assistant professor of zoology at Smith College (1928–30), but most of his career was spent as an investigator with the Carnegie Institution for Science at Cold Spring Harbor, New York (1930–44). From then until his death of a heart attack on March 15, 1950, he was professor of Anthropology at Hartford Seminary Foundation in Connecticut.

He was an honorary member of the American Eugenics Society, and a council member of the American Anthropological Association. He was a founding member of the American Association of Physical Anthropologists in 1930, and subsequently served on its Executive Committee and as its vice president.

Steggerda's academic biography and complete list of publications was published in the American Journal of Physical Anthropology Vol. 9 N.S.,  No. 1, March 1951.  It reveals a diversity of research topics and questions ranging from fingerprints, anthropometry, heredity, metabolism, family genealogies and histories.  Among this work are a study of the anthropometry of Smith College coeds from 1929 and a study of the detrimental effects of feeding a pigeon polished rice versus brown rice.  Steggerda joined the Division of Historical Research of the Carnegie Institution of Washington as part of the changes brought about with the hiring of Alfred V. Kidder as director of this research unit.  Both the change in the leadership of the CIW archaeology research (including its restructuring into the Division of Historical Research) and the reassignment of Steggerda (based in the CIW Genetics department) to help out in Maya archaeology were strategic decisions made by the President of the CIW, Merriam Campbell, who as a physical anthropologist interested in holistic evolutionary interpretations of cultures.  Steggerda's ethnographic based research in the community of Pisté, three kilometers from Chichen Itza provides data ranging from the profundity of soils from his experimental garden, complete descriptions of all architecture in the community within a five-year period (1933−1938), and meticulous anthropometry of the nearly 500 members of the community to useful social histories, a study of Maya fingerprints, and complete census materials for the 1930s.  Steggerda conducted eight years of research in Pisté.

The corpus of his research materials formed the basis for an ethnographic research project in the 1990s directed by Quetzil Castaneda.  The materials were curated in an interactive exhibition for the community to engage in the town hall over a three-day period. See also project description at www.osea-cite.org/history/chilam.php

Academic work
Some of his work was done in collaboration with the eugenicist Charles Davenport, with whom he wrote the book Race Crossing in Jamaica, published in 1929.

Despite his clear racial and specifically eugenic approach to human diversity, Steggerda was a bit different in interpretive outlook than his Davenport.  While Davenport converted the slightest bit of data or non-data into racial ideology, Steggerda was exceptionally circumspect.  He was methodical and precise and did not make interpretations that exceeded the methods and data employed in his research.  No doubt this is one aspect to the collaboration between Steggerda and Davenport:  Steggerda did the methodical work and Davenport did the interpretive exegesis of racial "hybridization."

Publications

Books
Steggerda, Morris. Physical development of negro-white hybrids in Jamaica, British West Indies. University of Illinois, 1928.
Steggerda, Morris, and Charles Benedict Davenport. Race Crossing in Jamaica. Carnegie Institution of Washington Publication 395. 1929. OCLC 489049898
Steggerda, Morris. Anthropometry of Adult Maya Indians: A Study of Their Physical and Physiological Characteristics. Carnegie Institution of Washington Publication 434. 1932.
Steggerda, Morris. Maya Indians of Yucatán. Carnegie Institution of Washington Publication 531. 1941. OCLC 616357. Reprint, New York: AMS Pr. 1984. 

Steggerda's complete list of publications was published in the American Journal of Physical Anthropology Vol. 9 N.S., No. 1, March 1951.
He published several dozen articles in journals such as Eugenical News, American Journal of Physical Anthropology, Journal of Comparative Psychology, American Journal of Physiology, Ecology, Poultry Science, Plant Physiology, American Dietitic, Science, Nature, and the Proceedings of the American Academy of Arts and Sciences.

References

1900 births
1950 deaths
People from Holland, Michigan
American people of Dutch descent
American eugenicists
20th-century American writers
People from Cold Spring Harbor, New York
Hope College alumni
University of Illinois alumni
Smith College faculty
20th-century American anthropologists